Fang Xin (born 1955) is a Chinese politician who currently serves in the Standing Committee of the National People's Congress as a member of the Chinese Communist Party. Prior to her political career she served as director of the Chinese Academy of Sciences Institute of Policy & Management.

Early life

Fang Xin was born in 1955, in Beijing, China. She graduated from the Beijing University of Technology in 1980, from the Beijing Institute of Technology with a Master of Arts in 1982, and from the Tsinghua University School of Economics and Management with a doctor of philosophy in 1997. From 1987 to 1988, she was a visiting scholar to George Washington University.

Career

In 2002, Fang was named as "An Outstanding Woman Leader" by the Central Committee of the Chinese Communist Party. Fang worked as director of the Chinese Academy of Sciences Institute of Policy & Management until her election to the Standing Committee of the National People's Congress in March 2003. Fang served as a delegate to the 16th National Congress of the Communist Party of China.

References

1955 births
21st-century Chinese politicians
21st-century Chinese women politicians
Living people